Karabo Sibanda (born 2 July 1998) is a sprinter from Botswana specialising in the 400 metres. Originally a junior chess player, after he saw Usain Bolt competing at the 2012 London Olympic Games he got so inspired by his performance, that he decided to be an athlete. He won two medals at the 2016 African Championships as well as multiple age group medals. He competed at the 2016 Summer Olympics, finishing fifth in the 400 metres final as barely an 18 year old in a still personal best of 44.25.

International competitions

‡Disqualified in the final

Personal bests
Outdoor
200 metres – 21.28 (+1.0 m/s, Potchefstroom 2016)
400 metres – 44.25 ( 2016 Rio de Janeiro Summer Olympics)

References

External links
 

1998 births
Living people
Botswana male sprinters
Athletes (track and field) at the 2014 Summer Youth Olympics
Athletes (track and field) at the 2016 Summer Olympics
Olympic athletes of Botswana
Athletes (track and field) at the 2018 Commonwealth Games
Commonwealth Games competitors for Botswana